José Pérez (born January 10, 1964) is a former Venezuelan boxer. At the 1988 Summer Olympics he lost in the second round of the men's lightweight division (– 60 kg) to Mongalia's eventual bronze medalist Nergüin Enkhbat. Pérez won a bronze medal at the 1986 Central American and Caribbean Games and a silver medal at the 1987 Pan American Games in the lightweight category.

References
Profile

1964 births
Living people
Welterweight boxers
Olympic boxers of Venezuela
Boxers at the 1988 Summer Olympics
Place of birth missing (living people)
Venezuelan male boxers
Boxers at the 1987 Pan American Games
Pan American Games silver medalists for Venezuela
Pan American Games medalists in boxing
Competitors at the 1986 Central American and Caribbean Games
Central American and Caribbean Games bronze medalists for Venezuela
Central American and Caribbean Games medalists in boxing
Medalists at the 1987 Pan American Games
20th-century Venezuelan people
21st-century Venezuelan people